There are at least 20 named trails in Beaverhead County, Montana according to the U.S. Geological Survey, Board of Geographic Names.  A trail is defined as: "Route for passage from one point to another; does not include roads or highways (jeep trail, path, ski trail)."

 Alder Creek Trail, el.  
 Blue Creek Trail, el.  
 Bobcat Lakes Trail, el.  
 Bull Creek Polecreek Trail, el.  
 Copper Creek Trail, el.  
 Cornell Trail, el.  
 Driveway Trail, el.  
 Gold Creek Trail, el.  
 Grassy Lake Trail, el.  
 Hidden Pasture Trail, el.  
 Hiline Trail, el.  
 Lodgepole Trail, el.  
 Old Tim Creek Trail, el.  
 Pole Creek Trail, el.  
 Rhubarb Patch Trail, el.  
 Sawtooth Trail, el.  
 Shoestring Creek Bear Wallow Creek Trail, el.  
 Snowcrest Trail, el.  
 Stine Creek Trail, el.  
 Table Mountain Trail, el.

Further reading

See also
 List of trails of Montana
 Trails of Yellowstone National Park

Notes

Geography of Beaverhead County, Montana
 Beaverhead County
Transportation in Beaverhead County, Montana